The animation photo transfer process (APT process) was a photographic transfer system that can photographically transfer lines or solid blocks of colors onto acetate sheets (cels). A similar process is used in making the stencils for silk screen printing. The process relies on UV-sensitive inks that cure when exposed to light and stick to the plastic sheet, while the ink in the non-exposed areas is chemically removed from the sheet.

Advantages
Compared to the earlier xerography process used by Disney, the lines can be controlled better and multiple copies made quickly. The drawings are photographed on high-contrast sheet film, and these negatives are then exposed onto the cels. A line on an animated character can be in color instead of just black. This is known as self-colored lines. (Xerographic lines were rendered in color too, when colored toners became available.)

Examples
This process was used on Disney's animated features such as The Black Cauldron, The Great Mouse Detective, Oliver & Company, and The Little Mermaid.

See also
The Black Cauldron
Timeline of CGI in film and television
Traditional animation

References

External links
The APT Process on the AllExperts forum
US Patent Number 4569577 on Google Patent Search

Visual effects
Animation techniques